Parker Branch is a  long 1st order tributary to Gum Branch in Sussex County, Delaware.

Course
Parker Branch rises on the Beaver Dam Branch divide about 2 miles west-southwest of Ellendale, Delaware and then flows southwest to join Gum Branch about 3 miles southwest of Ellendale.

Watershed
Parker Branch drains  of area, receives about 45.4 in/year of precipitation, has a topographic wetness index of 738.49 and is about 11% forested.

See also
List of Delaware rivers

References

Rivers of Delaware
Rivers of Sussex County, Delaware
Tributaries of the Nanticoke River